The 1963–64 Algerian Championnat National was the second season of the Algerian Championnat National since its establishment in 1962. A total of 49 teams contested the league, with USM Alger as the defending champions. USM Annaba was the winner beating in the final NA Hussein Dey.

League table

Algérois

Oranie

Constantinois
In Constantine, the Honor Division is divided into two regional groups each containing 8 teams. The winners of the two groups qualify for the final tournament.

Eastern Group

West group

Final tournament

References

External links
1963–64 Algerian Championnat National

Algerian Ligue Professionnelle 1 seasons
1963–64 in Algerian football
Algeria